Arizona State University Colleges at Lake Havasu City (ASU Havasu) is a satellite campus of the Arizona State University in Lake Havasu City, Arizona. It opened in Fall 2012 and focuses on an experiential, student-centered approach to learning. The education and experience a student receives at ASU Havasu is intended to be akin to that of a private liberal arts college with the name and resources of a large state school.

History 

The "ASU Colleges" model was formulated in 2009 as an initiative to offer high quality, undergraduate degrees at lower costs. The Arizona Board of Regents, along with the presidents of each public Arizona university, were tasked with coming up with models of offering baccalaureate degrees to help prepare students for real world careers. In order for the idea to work, the city in which the college would be located would have to raise the funds for a physical location of the campus. Several locations throughout Arizona were highlighted, but the one city that pushed for the campus was Lake Havasu City. With support from local citizens, business owners, city officials, and non-profit organizations, $2 million was raised in an effort to renovate a previous middle school site for the ASU Havasu campus. The fundraising efforts were coordinated by the Havasu Foundation for Higher Education (HFHE), a 501(c)3 non-profit organization, that was started in 2004 by Dr. Bill Ullery. The HFHE was started as an initiative to highlight the importance of higher education in the Mohave County area. The HFHE continues to offer fundraising opportunities for campus projects and scholarships for new and current students.

Academics 

ASU Havasu offers an interdisciplinary approach to student education and curriculum. There are 18 bachelor's degrees and 3 exploratory programs that students can choose from. Since the opening of the campus is 2012, ASU Havasu has graduated 58 students.

Facilities

Residence Hall 
In March 2015, ASU purchased the motel that sat on the Northwest corner of the lot where ASU Havasu is situated. As phase 1 of the project, the 20 outer rooms were gutted and renovated. For the first time since opening in fall of 2012, ASU Havasu had on-campus housing for the fall of 2015.

Phase 2 of the residence hall project took place in the summer of 2016. 11 rooms in the middle building were renovated to accommodate for increasing enrollment in the fall of 2016. There are double, single, and ADA compliant rooms, each costing $5,700, $6,500, and $6,000, respectively.

Dedication Wall and Student Center Patio 
A dedication wall sits in the center of campus. The wall commemorates the efforts of the Lake Havasu City community in raising $2 million to start the campus. Behind the wall rests the student center. The patio of the student center boasts one of the best views of Lake Havasu and the surrounding mountain ranges.

References

External links

 Official website

Universities and colleges in Phoenix, Arizona
Arizona State University campuses
Public universities and colleges in Arizona
Educational institutions established in 2012
2012 establishments in Arizona